Gural is a surname. Notable people with the surname include:

 Aaron Gural (1917–2009), American businessman
 Emre Güral (born 1989), Turkish football player
 Jeffrey Gural (born 1942), American real estate developer

See also
 
 Gura (surname)